Douglas County is a county in the U.S. state of South Dakota. As of the 2020 census, the population was 2,835. Its county seat is Armour. The county was established in 1873 and organized in 1882. It is named for Stephen Douglas, Illinois political figure.

Geography
The terrain of Douglas County consists of rolling hills, mostly dedicated to agriculture. The county's highest point is on its southwestern boundary, toward the SW corner, at 1,677' (511m) ASL. The terrain slopes to the east. It is the second-smallest county in South Dakota by area.

Major highways

  U.S. Highway 18
  U.S. Highway 281
  South Dakota Highway 44
  South Dakota Highway 50

Adjacent counties

 Aurora County - north
 Davison County - northeast
 Hutchinson County - east
 Charles Mix County - southwest

Lakes
 Corsica Lake

Demographics

2000 census
As of the 2000 United States Census of 2000, there were 3,458 people, 1,321 households, and 947 families in the county. The population density was 8 people per square mile (3/km2). There were 1,453 housing units at an average density of 3 per square mile (1/km2). The racial makeup of the county was 98.06% White, 0.06% Black or African American, 0.98% Native American, 0.14% Asian, 0.12% from other races, and 0.64% from two or more races. 0.38% of the population were Hispanic or Latino of any race. 43.0% were of German and 37.3% Dutch ancestry.

There were 1,321 households, out of which 32.20% had children under the age of 18 living with them, 65.40% were married couples living together, 3.60% had a female householder with no husband present, and 28.30% were non-families. 26.80% of all households were made up of individuals, and 15.40% had someone living alone who was 65 years of age or older. The average household size was 2.54 and the average family size was 3.10.

The county population contained 27.70% under the age of 18, 4.90% from 18 to 24, 22.40% from 25 to 44, 22.40% from 45 to 64, and 22.60% who were 65 years of age or older. The median age was 42 years. For every 100 females there were 95.10 males. For every 100 females age 18 and over, there were 92.30 males.

The median income for a household in the county was $28,478, and the median income for a family was $33,935. Males had a median income of $25,425 versus $18,309 for females. The per capita income for the county was $13,827. About 12.20% of families and 14.60% of the population were below the poverty line, including 16.80% of those under age 18 and 14.90% of those age 65 or over.

2010 census
As of the 2010 United States Census, there were 3,002 people, 1,210 households, and 819 families in the county. The racial makeup of the county was 96.6% white, 1.8% American Indian, 0.4% black or African American, 0.1% Asian, 0.3% from other races, and 0.9% from two or more races. Those of Hispanic or Latino origin made up 0.8% of the population. In terms of ancestry, 34.8% were Dutch, 33.9% were German, 5.6% were Norwegian, 5.5% were Irish, 5.4% were Russian, and 5.1% were American.

Of the 1,210 households, 25.5% had children under the age of 18 living with them, 60.8% were married couples living together, 4.2% had a female householder with no husband present, 32.3% were non-families, and 29.1% of all households were made up of individuals. The average household size was 2.33 and the average family size was 2.89. The median age was 48.3 years.

The median income for a household in the county was $42,794 and the median income for a family was $53,750. Males had a median income of $36,689 versus $24,883 for females. The per capita income for the county was $22,200. About 7.2% of families and 9.8% of the population were below the poverty line, including 10.9% of those under age 18 and 15.2% of those age 65 or over.

Communities

Cities
 Armour (county seat)
 Corsica
 Delmont

Census-designated places
 Greenwood Colony
 Harrison
 New Holland

Unincorporated community
 Joubert

Townships

Belmont
Chester
Clark
East Choleau
Garfield
Grandview
Holland
Independence
Iowa
Joubert
Lincoln
Valley
Walnut Grove
Washington

Politics
Douglas County voters have long been reliably Republican. In only two national elections since 1892 has the county selected the Democratic Party candidate.

See also
 National Register of Historic Places listings in Douglas County, South Dakota

References

 
1882 establishments in Dakota Territory
Populated places established in 1882